Abbas Mohtaj is an Iranian military officer and politician.

He served in the Islamic Revolutionary Guard Corps during Iran–Iraq War and was moved to the Islamic Republic of Iran Army after the war, holding office as the Commander of the Islamic Republic of Iran Navy between 1997 and 2005. Mohtaj was a government official in the administration of Mahmoud Ahmadinejad from 2005 to 2009, serving as a governor and then a vice minister.

Military career 
Mohtaj was deputy chairman of the General Staff of the Revolutionary Guards from 1988 to 1989. He was appointed as the deputy commander of the Ground Forces of the Revolutionary Guards under Mostafa Izadi in 1989. When Ali Shamkhani held office as the commander of Iran's regular Navy and Navy of the Revolutionary Guards simultaneously, Mohtaj was his deputy in the former maritime forces since October 1990 and succeeded Shamkhani as the commander of that military branch in 1997.

References

Commanders of Islamic Republic of Iran Navy
Islamic Revolutionary Guard Corps personnel of the Iran–Iraq War
Governors of Qom Province
Iranian Vice Ministers
Year of birth missing (living people)
Living people
Islamic Republic of Iran Navy commodores